The Vancouver version of the UWA Tag Team Championship was the tag team title in All Star Wrestling from its establishment sometime after All Star disaffiliated from the National Wrestling Alliance in late-1985 until the promotion closed in 1989.

Title history

See also

Professional wrestling in Canada

References

External links
 Vance Nevada's Canadian Wrestling Results Archive (Western Canada 1985-1989)

Tag team wrestling championships
Professional wrestling in British Columbia